The Gulfstream Aerospace Invitational was a golf tournament on the Champions Tour from 1984 to 1993.
It was played in Indian Wells, California at The Vintage Club (1981–1992) and at the Indian Wells Golf Resort (1993).

The purse for the 1993 tournament was US$550,000, with $82,500 going to the winner. The tournament was founded in 1981 as The Vintage Invitational.

Winners
Gulfstream Aerospace Invitational
1993 Raymond Floyd

The Vintage ARCO Invitational
1992 Mike Hill
1991 Chi-Chi Rodríguez

Vintage Chrysler Invitational
1990 Lee Trevino
1989 Miller Barber
1988 Orville Moody
1987 Bob Charles

The Vintage Invitational
1986 Dale Douglass
1985 Peter Thomson
1984 Don January

Vintage Invitational
unofficial
1983  Gene Littler
1982  Miller Barber
1981  Gene Littler

Source:

References

External links
Results (1990–1993) at GolfObserver.com

Former PGA Tour Champions events
Golf in California
Recurring sporting events established in 1981
Recurring sporting events disestablished in 1993
1981 establishments in California
1993 disestablishments in California